Śakra (Sanskrit: शक्र Śakra; Pali: सक्क Sakka) is the ruler of the Trāyastriṃśa Heaven according to Buddhist cosmology.  He is also referred to by the title "Śakra, Lord of the Devas". The name Śakra ("powerful") as an epithet of Indra is found in several verses of the Rigveda.

In East Asian cultural traditions, Śakra is known as Dìshìtiān (帝釋天) or Shìtí Huányīn (釋提桓因) in Chinese, as Taishakuten (帝釈天) in Japanese, as Jeseokcheon (제석천) in Korean, and as Đế Thích Thiên (帝釋天) or Thích Đề Hoàn Nhân (釋提桓因) in Vietnamese. In Chinese Buddhism, Śakra is sometimes identified with the Taoist Jade Emperor (Yùhuáng Dàdì 玉皇大帝, often simplified to Yùhuáng 玉皇); both share a birthday on the ninth day of the first lunar month of the Chinese calendar (usually in February) and in Vietnamese Buddhism, sometimes Śakra is also identified with the Ngọc Hoàng.

The Trāyastriṃśa heaven in which Śakra rules is located on the top of Mount Meru, imagined to be the polar center of the physical world, around which the Sun and Moon revolve. Trāyastriṃśa is the highest of the heavens in direct contact with humankind. Like all deities, Śakra is long-lived but mortal.  When one Śakra dies, his place is taken by another deity who becomes the new Śakra. Several stories about Śakra are found in the Jataka tales, as well as several suttas.

Śakra is married to Sujā, daughter of the chief of the asuras, Vemacitrin (Pāli Vepacitti). Despite this relationship, a state of war generally exists between the thirty-three gods and the asuras, which Śakra manages to resolve with minimal violence and no loss of life.

Śakra is often depicted in literature as a being who consults the Buddha on matters of morality. Together with Brahmā, he is considered a dharmapala, a protector of Buddhism.

Etymology
"Śakra" is a Sanskrit word meaning ""mighty"" or "powerful," and is used as an epithet of Indra in hymn 5.34 of the Rigveda. This seems to have been the standard name carried over into Buddhist tradition.

Names
Śakra is known by several names in Buddhist texts. Some of these include:

Indra (Sanskrit; Chinese: 因陀羅; pinyin: Yīntuóluó; Japanese: Indara, Tib. དབང་པོ་ dbang po)
Mahendranīla (Sanskrit; lit. "Great Indra the Dark")
Sahassākkha (Chinese: 娑婆婆; pinyin: Suōpópo; Japanese: Sababa; or 婆婆; pinyin: Pópo; Japanese: Baba). 
Sahasrekṣaṇa (Sanskrit; Chinese: 千眼; pinyin: Qiānyǎn; lit. "Thousand Eyes")
(Chinese: 天主; pinyin: Tiānzhǔ; lit. "Lord of Heaven")

Theravāda
Sakka's mythology and character is expounded upon in the Pali Canon, particularly in the Sakka Saṃyutta of the Saṃyutta Nikāya.

Sakka plays a significant role in several of the Jātaka tales.

The commentator Buddhaghoṣa has identified Sakka as being identical to Vajrapāṇi.

In the Mahāparinibbāna Sutta (DN 16), Sakka speaks the following verse, which has become standard in Buddhist funeral rites:

Mahāyāna
In the Book of Equanimity, Śakra plays a central role in the fourth koan.

In the Mahāparinirvāṇa Sūtra, Śakra utters a stanza in response to the Buddha's death as a recognition of the Four Noble Truths. It is identical to the Pali formula found in the corresponding sutta.:

He is also recognized as one of the Twenty-Four Guardian Devas in Chinese Buddhist tradition.

Iconography
In Southeast Asia, primarily among Theravada communities, Śakra is depicted with blue or black skin.

Folk belief
Śakra is equated with Haneullim in Korean folk religion. According to the Memorabilia of the Three Kingdoms, it is believed that Śakra is Hwanung's father.

In Chinese Buddhism, some equate him with the Jade Emperor.

In Mongolian Buddhism, Qormusta Tengri is syncretized with Śakra, and is believed to be involved with the creation of fire.

The ceremonial name of Bangkok alludes to Śakra:

This name is composed of both Pāli and Sanskrit, prefaced with the only one Thai word, Krung, which means 'capital'. It can thus be written as:
"Krung-dēvamahānagara amararatanakosindra mahindrāyudhyā mahātilakabhava navaratanarājadhānī purīramya uttamarājanivēsana mahāsthāna amaravimāna avatārasthitya shakrasdattiya vishnukarmaprasiddhi."

Popular culture
Śakra makes several appearances in popular culture, including:

He is a character in the mobile game Monster Strike.
He appears as a villain in the Chinese comic Fung Wan.
He also appears as a villain in the manga series RG Veda.
Indra Ōtsutsuki from the Naruto series is loosely based on Śakra. His younger brother's name is Asura, which plays on the myth of the battle between the deva and the asura.
It is possible that Kami and Mr. Popo from the Dragon Ball series share a connection with Śakra. Mr. Popo's name is phonetically similar to the Chinese pronunciation of Sahassākkha (婆婆 Pópo), an epithet of Śakra. Kami's role as guardian deity is also similar to Śakra's relationship with the human world. This is further supported by the function of the Lookout, Kami's temple, which is reminiscent of Trāyastriṃśa heaven. Traditionally, this heaven is depicted as a flat surface on the top of Mt. Sumeru. There are thirty-two trees on the Lookout, which equate to the same number of palaces in Trāyastriṃśa (not counting the thirty-third, Śakra's palace, exemplified by the hyperbolic time chamber).

See also
 King of the Gods
Counterparts of Śakra in other cultures
 Jade Emperor, the Chinese counterpart
Amenominakanushi, the Japanese counterpart 
 Haneullim, the Korean counterpart
 Indra, the Hindu counterpart
 Tengri, the Turko-Mongolian counterpart
 Thagyamin, the Burmese Buddhist representation of Śakra, a counterpart of the Jade Emperor
 Yuanshi Tianzun, Taoist counterpart

References

Bibliography
 Bhikkhu Analayo (2011). Śakra and the Destruction of Craving – A Case Study in the Role of Śakra in Early Buddhism, The Indian International Journal of Buddhist Studies 12, 157-176
 

Buddhist gods
Mythological kings
Thunder gods
Trickster gods
Buddhist deities
Buddhist cosmology
Twenty-Four Protective Deities